Harry Nelson Atwood (November 15, 1883 – July 14, 1967) was an American engineer and inventor known for pioneering work in the early days of aviation, including setting long-distance flying records and delivering the first delivery of air mail in New England.

Early life
Atwood was born on November 15, 1883 in Roxbury, Boston, Massachusetts.

He trained at the Wright Flying School at Huffman Prairie, near Dayton, Ohio, with fellow students Thomas D. Milling, Calbraith Perry Rodgers and Henry H. Arnold. Within three months of his first lesson he flew a record-breaking  from Boston to Washington, DC, and on July 14, 1911, landed on the White House lawn.  A prize of $10,000 was offered to Atwood to fly between Chicago and Milwaukee on August 10. Between August 14, 1911 and August 25, 1911 he flew  from St. Louis to New York City, making 11 stops and spending 28 hours 31 minutes in the air. Atwood funded his flying activities with the sale of two different electric meter designs to General Electric.

Aviation career

Straight out of flight school in May 1911, Atwood became the chief flight instructor for William Starling Burgess whose Burgess Company built a variety of airplanes, including licensed Wright aircraft between 1911 and 1913. In 1912, Atwood signed with the General Aviation Corporation for three years. The company purchased Franklin Park race track in Saugus, Massachusetts and converted it into an airfield, which they named after Atwood. Atwood served as the chief instructor of the company's flight instruction school there from the time it opened until he quit on June 10, 1912 because he could make more money in exhibition flights and because he was disenchanted with fellow instructor Arch Freeman. On May 31, 1912, Atwood made the first airmail delivery in New England. He flew about five miles (8 km) from Atwood Park to the Lynn, Massachusetts Town Commons where he dropped a sack of mail from the plane. The sack was then retrieved by a Lynn postal employee and driven to the post office.

Personal life
Atwood was married five times. His first marriage was to Sarah Jenkins of Lynn, Massachusetts. The union resulted in two children: Edgar, who died at the age of 3 days, and Bethany. The couple later divorced. On March 2, 1914, Atwood married Ruth Satterthwaite in a courthouse ceremony in her hometown of Reading, Pennsylvania. The couple had three children, Katrina, Gene, and Ruth. Atwood and his wife remained wed until she died in October 1920 at the age of 27.  His third wife, Helen Satterthwaite, was the widow of Ruth's brother. They were married for 90 days before divorcing. His fourth wife, Mary Dalton died shortly after giving birth to their son, Harry, Jr., in 1930. Harry, Jr. was raised by a minister and his wife. His fifth wife was his housekeeper Nellie Pickens. They had one daughter, Nelda Stiles. Atwood died on July 14, 1967 in Murphy, North Carolina at age 83.

References

External links

Harry Atwood Takes Off From White House South Lawn by Ghosts of DC history blog

Harry Nelson Atwood at Early Aviators

1883 births
1967 deaths
American aviators
Members of the Early Birds of Aviation
Wright Flying School alumni
American aviation record holders
People from Roxbury, Boston
People from Murphy, North Carolina